The YubiKey is a hardware authentication device manufactured by Yubico to protect access to computers, networks, and online services that supports one-time passwords (OTP), public-key cryptography, and authentication, and the Universal 2nd Factor (U2F) and FIDO2 protocols developed by the FIDO Alliance. It allows users to securely log into their accounts by emitting one-time passwords or using a FIDO-based public/private key pair generated by the device. YubiKey also allows for storing static passwords for use at sites that do not support one-time passwords. Google, Amazon, Microsoft, Twitter, and Facebook use YubiKey devices to secure employee accounts as well as end user accounts.  Some password managers support YubiKey. Yubico also manufactures the Security Key, a similar lower cost device with only FIDO2/WebAuthn and FIDO/U2F support.

The YubiKey implements the HMAC-based One-time Password Algorithm (HOTP) and the Time-based One-time Password Algorithm (TOTP), and identifies itself as a keyboard that delivers the one-time password over the USB HID protocol. A YubiKey can also present itself as an OpenPGP card using 1024, 2048, 3072 and 4096-bit RSA (for key sizes over 2048 bits, GnuPG version 2.0 or higher is required) and elliptic curve cryptography (ECC) p256, p384 and more depending on version, allowing users to sign, encrypt and decrypt messages without exposing the private keys to the outside world. Also supported is the PKCS#11 standard to emulate a PIV smart card. This feature allows for code signing of Docker images as well as certificate-based authentication for Microsoft Active Directory and SSH.

Founded in 2007 by CEO Stina Ehrensvärd, Yubico is a private company with offices in Palo Alto, Seattle, and Stockholm. Yubico CTO, Jakob Ehrensvärd, is the lead author of the original strong authentication specification that became known as Universal 2nd Factor (U2F).

YubiKey released the YubiKey 5 series in 2018 which adds support for FIDO2.

History 
Yubico was founded in 2007 and began offering a Pilot Box for developers in November of that year. The original YubiKey product was shown at the annual RSA Conference in April 2008, and a more robust YubiKey II model was launched in 2009. Yubico's explanation of the name "YubiKey" is that it derives from the phrase "your ubiquitous key", and that "yubi" is the Japanese word for finger.

YubiKey II and later models have two "slots" available, for storing two distinct configurations with separate AES secrets and other settings. When authenticating the first slot is used by only briefly pressing the button on the device, while the second slot gets used when holding the button for 2 to 5 seconds.

In 2010, Yubico began offering the YubiKey OATH and YubiKey RFID models. The YubiKey OATH added the ability to generate 6- and 8-character one-time passwords using protocols from the Initiative for Open Authentication (OATH), in addition to the 32-character passwords used by Yubico's own OTP authentication scheme. The YubiKey RFID model included the OATH capability plus also included a MIFARE Classic 1k radio-frequency identification chip, though that was a separate device within the package that could not be configured with the normal Yubico software over a USB connection.

Yubico announced the YubiKey Nano in February 2012, a miniaturized version of the standard YubiKey which was designed so it would fit almost entirely inside a USB port and only expose a small touch pad for the button. Most later models of the YubiKey have also been available in both standard and "nano" sizes.

2012 also saw the introduction of the YubiKey Neo, which improved upon the previous YubiKey RFID product by implementing near-field communication (NFC) technology and integrating it with the USB side of the device. The YubiKey Neo (and Neo-n, a "nano" version of the device) are able to transmit one-time passwords to NFC readers as part of a configurable URL contained in a NFC Data Exchange Format (NDEF) message. The Neo is also able to communicate using the CCID smart-card protocol in addition to USB HID (human interface device) keyboard emulation. The CCID mode is used for PIV smart card and OpenPGP support, while USB HID is used for the one-time password authentication schemes.

In 2014, the YubiKey Neo was updated with FIDO Universal 2nd Factor (U2F) support. Later that year, Yubico released the FIDO U2F Security Key, which specifically included U2F support but none of the other one-time password, static password, smart card, or NFC features of previous YubiKeys. At launch, it was correspondingly sold at a lower price point of just $18, compared to $25 for the YubiKey Standard ($40 for the Nano version), and $50 for the YubiKey Neo ($60 for Neo-n). Some of the pre-release devices issued by Google during FIDO/U2F development reported themselves as "Yubico WinUSB Gnubby (gnubby1)".

In April 2015, the company launched the YubiKey Edge in both standard and nano form factors. This slotted in between the Neo and FIDO U2F products feature-wise, as it was designed to handle OTP and U2F authentication, but did not include smart card or NFC support.

The YubiKey 4 family of devices was first launched in November 2015, with USB-A models in both standard and nano sizes. The YubiKey 4 includes most features of the YubiKey Neo, including increasing the allowed OpenPGP key size to 4096 bits (vs. the previous 2048), but dropped the NFC capability of the Neo.

At CES 2017, Yubico announced an expansion of the YubiKey 4 series to support a new USB-C design. The YubiKey 4C was released on February 13, 2017. On Android OS over the USB-C connection, only the one-time password feature is supported by the Android OS and YubiKey, with other features not currently supported including Universal 2nd Factor (U2F). A 4C Nano version became available in September 2017.

In April 2018, the company brought out the Security Key by Yubico, their first device to implement the new FIDO2 authentication protocols, WebAuthn (which reached W3C Candidate Recommendation status in March) and Client to Authenticator Protocol (CTAP). At launch, the device is only available in the "standard" form factor with a USB-A connector.  Like the previous FIDO U2F Security Key, it is blue in color and uses a key icon on its button. It is distinguished by a number "2" etched into the plastic between the button and the keyring hole. It is also less expensive than the YubiKey Neo and YubiKey 4 models, costing $20 per unit at launch because it lacks the OTP and smart card features of those previous devices, though it retains FIDO U2F capability.

Product features 
A list of the primary features and capabilities of the YubiKey products.

|-
! YubiKey VIP !! YubiKey Plus !! YubiKey Nano !! YubiKey NEO-n !! YubiKey 4 Nano !! YubiKey Edge-n !! YubiKey Standard !! YubiHSM 1 !! FIDO U2F Security Key !! Security Key by Yubico !! YubiKey NEO !! YubiKey 4C Nano !! YubiKey 4C !! YubiKey 4 Nano !! YubiKey 4 !! YubiKey C Nano FIPS !! YubiKey C FIPS !! YubiKey Nano FIPS !! YubiKey FIPS !! YubiHSM 2 !! Security Key NFC by Yubico !! YubiKey 5C Nano !! YubiKey 5C !! YubiKey 5 Nano !! YubiKey 5 NFC !! YubiKey 5Ci !! YubiKey 5C NFC
|-
| 2011–2017 || 2014–2015 || 2012–2016 || 2014–2016 || 2016–2017 || 2015–2016 || 2014–2016 || 2015–2017 || 2013–2018 || 2018–2020 || 2012–2018 || 2017–2018 || 2017–2018 || 2015–2018 || 2015–2018 || 2018–present || 2018–present || 2018–present || 2018–present || 2017–present || 2019–present || 2018–present || 2018–present || 2018–present || 2018–present || 2019–present || 2020–present
|-
| Yes || Yes ||  ||  ||  ||  ||  ||  ||  ||  ||  ||  ||  ||  ||  ||  ||  ||  ||  ||  ||  ||  ||  ||  ||  ||  || 
|-
|  ||  || Yes || Yes || Yes || Yes || Yes ||  ||  ||  || Yes || Yes || Yes || Yes || Yes ||  ||  ||  ||  ||  ||  || Yes || Yes || Yes || Yes || Yes || Yes
|-
|  ||  || Yes || Yes || Yes || Yes || Yes ||  ||  ||  || Yes || Yes || Yes || Yes || Yes ||  ||  ||  ||  ||  ||  || Yes || Yes || Yes || Yes || Yes || Yes
|-
|  ||  || Yes || Yes || Yes || Yes || Yes ||  ||  ||  || Yes || Yes || Yes || Yes || Yes ||  ||  ||  ||  ||  ||  || Yes || Yes || Yes || Yes || Yes || Yes
|-
|  ||  ||  || Yes ||  ||  ||  ||  ||  ||  || Yes || Yes || Yes || Yes || Yes ||  ||  ||  ||  ||  ||  || Yes || Yes || Yes || Yes || Yes || Yes
|-
|  ||  ||  || Yes || Yes || Yes ||  ||  ||  ||  || Yes || Yes || Yes || Yes || Yes ||  ||  ||  ||  ||  ||  || Yes || Yes || Yes || Yes || Yes || Yes
|-
|  ||  ||  || Yes || Yes || Yes ||  ||  ||  ||  || Yes || Yes || Yes || Yes || Yes ||  ||  ||  ||  ||  ||  || Yes || Yes || Yes || Yes || Yes || Yes
|-
|  || Yes ||  || Yes || Yes || Yes ||  ||  || Yes || Yes || Yes || Yes || Yes || Yes || Yes ||  ||  ||  ||  ||  || Yes || Yes || Yes || Yes || Yes || Yes || Yes
|-
|  ||  ||  ||  ||  ||  ||  ||  ||  || Yes ||  ||  ||  ||  ||  ||  ||  ||  ||  ||  || Yes || Yes || Yes || Yes || Yes || Yes || Yes
|-
|  ||  ||  ||  ||  ||  ||  || Yes ||  ||  ||  ||  ||  ||  ||  ||  ||  ||  ||  || Yes ||  ||  ||  ||  ||  ||  || 
|-
|  ||  ||  ||  ||  ||  ||  ||  ||  ||  ||  ||  ||  ||  ||  || Yes || Yes || Yes || Yes ||  ||  ||  ||  ||  ||  ||  || 
|-
|  ||  ||  ||  ||  ||  ||  ||  ||  ||  || Yes ||  ||  ||  ||  ||  ||  ||  ||  ||  || Yes ||  ||  ||  || Yes ||  || Yes
|-
| Yes || Yes || Yes || Yes || Yes || Yes || Yes || Yes || Yes || Yes || Yes ||  ||  || Yes || Yes ||  ||  || Yes || Yes || Yes || Yes ||  ||  || Yes || Yes ||  || 
|-
|  ||  ||  ||  ||  ||  ||  ||  ||  ||  ||  || Yes || Yes ||  ||  || Yes || Yes ||  ||  ||  ||  || Yes || Yes ||  ||  || Yes || Yes
|-
|  ||  ||  ||  ||  ||  ||  ||  ||  ||  ||  ||  ||  ||  ||  ||  ||  ||  ||  ||  ||  ||  ||  ||  ||  || Yes ||

ModHex 
When being used for one-time passwords and stored static passwords, the YubiKey emits characters using a modified hexadecimal alphabet which is intended to be as independent of system keyboard settings as possible. This alphabet, referred to as ModHex or Modified Hexadecimal, consists of the characters "cbdefghijklnrtuv", corresponding to the hexadecimal digits "0123456789abcdef". 

Since YubiKeys use raw keyboard scan codes in USB HID mode, there can be problems when using the devices on computers that are set up with different keyboard layouts, such as Dvorak. This issue can be addressed by using operating system features to temporarily switch to a standard US keyboard layout (or similar) when using one-time passwords.  However, YubiKey Neo and later devices can be configured with alternate scan codes to match layouts that aren't compatible with the ModHex character set.

U2F authentication in YubiKeys and Security Keys bypasses this problem by using the alternate U2FHID protocol, which sends and receives raw binary messages instead of keyboard scan codes. CCID mode acts as a smart card reader, which does not use HID protocols at all.

Security issues

YubiKey 4 closed-sourcing concerns 
Most of the code that runs on a YubiKey is closed source. While Yubico has released some code for industry standard functionality like PGP and HOTP it was disclosed that as of the 4th generation of the product this is not the same code that the new units ship with. Because new units are permanently firmware locked at the factory it is not possible to compile the open source code and load it on the device manually, a user must trust that the code on a new key is authentic and secure.

Code for other functionality such as U2F, PIV and Modhex is entirely closed source.

On May 16, 2016, Yubico CTO Jakob Ehrensvärd responded to the open-source community's concerns with a blog post saying that "we, as a product company, have taken a clear stand against implementations based on off-the-shelf components and further believe that something like a commercial-grade AVR or ARM controller is unfit to be used in a security product."

Techdirt founder Mike Masnick strongly criticized this decision, saying "Encryption is tricky. There are almost always vulnerabilities and bugs -- a point we've been making a lot lately. But the best way to fix those tends to be getting as many knowledgeable eyes on the code as possible. And that's not possible when it's closed source."

ROCA vulnerability in certain YubiKey 4, 4C, and 4 Nano devices 
In October 2017, security researchers found a vulnerability (known as ROCA) in the implementation of RSA keypair generation in a cryptographic library used by a large number of Infineon security chips, as used in a wide range of security keys and security token products (including YubiKey). The vulnerability allows an attacker to reconstruct the private key by using the public key. All YubiKey 4, YubiKey 4C, and YubiKey 4 Nano devices within the revisions 4.2.6 to 4.3.4 were affected by this vulnerability. Yubico remedied this issue in all shipping YubiKey 4 devices by switching to a different key generation function and offered free replacements for any affected keys. The replacement offer ended on March 31, 2019. In some cases the issue can be bypassed by generating new keys outside of the YubiKey and importing them onto the device.

OTP Password Protection on YubiKey NEO 
In January 2018, Yubico disclosed a moderate vulnerability where password protection for the OTP functionality on the YubiKey NEO could be bypassed under certain conditions. The issue was corrected as of firmware version 3.5.0 and Yubico offered free replacement keys to any user claiming to be affected.

Reduced initial randomness on certain FIPS series devices 
In June 2019, Yubico released a security advisory reporting reduced randomness in FIPS-certified devices with firmware version 4.4.2 and 4.4.4 (there is no version 4.4.3), shortly after power-up. Security keys with reduced randomness may leave keys more easily discovered and compromised than expected. The issue affected the FIPS series only, and then only certain scenarios, although FIPS ECDSA usage was "at higher risk". The company offered free replacements for any affected keys.

Social activism 
Yubico provided 500 YubiKeys to protesters during the 2019–2020 Hong Kong protests. The company states the decision is based on their mission to protect vulnerable Internet users, and works with free speech supporters.

See also 
 OpenPGP card

References

External links 
 
 YubiKey 5 comparison table
 YubiKey FIPS comparison table

2007 establishments in California
Authentication methods
Companies based in Palo Alto, California
Companies based in Seattle
Companies based in Stockholm
Computer access control
Computer companies established in 2007
Cryptographic hardware
Technology companies based in the San Francisco Bay Area